Reel Love Presents Tween Hearts is a Philippine television drama romance series broadcast by GMA Network. Directed by Gina Alajar, it stars Barbie Forteza, Joshua Dionisio, Bea Binene and Jake Vargas. It premiered on September 26, 2010, replacing Love Bug. The series concluded on June 10, 2012, with a total of 87 episodes. It was replaced by Together Forever in its timeslot.

The series is streaming online on YouTube.

Cast and characters

Main cast
 Barbie Forteza as Barbara "Bambi" Fortez
 Bea Binene as Belinda "Belle" Fortez
 Joshua Dionisio as Joshua "Josh" Diones
 Jake Vargas as Jacob Vergara
 Kristofer Martin as Christoper "Chris" Soriano
 Joyce Ching as Ligaya "Aya" Baltazar-Chan
 Derrick Monasterio as Ricardo "Rick" Montano
 Louise delos Reyes as Luisa dela Cruz
 Lexi Fernandez as Leslie "Les" Fernan
 Kylie Padilla as Heidilyn "Heidi" Rivera
 Marlo Mortel as Uno Morales

Recurring cast
 Hiro Peralta as Bayani "Ian" de Castro
 Yassi Pressman as Eunice Fuentabella
 Ken Chan as Mackenzie "Mac" Santos
 Kim Rodriguez as Angela "Angel" Villavicencio
 Teejay Marquez as Nathaniel Antonio "Nathan" Dimagalpok
 Rhen Escaño as Lucy Villavicencio
 Krystal Reyes as Mallory Santos
 Kiko Estrada as Kevin Del Mundo
 Julie Anne San Jose as Mira

Supporting cast
 Gabby Eigenmann as Coach A/Bulldog/Sir Boris
 Roxanne Barcelo as Rose Diones
 Emilio Garcia as Ted Fortez
 Sylvia Sanchez as Irene Fortez
 Richard Quan as Emerson Chan
 Pinky Amador as Liwayway Baltazar-Chan
 Tina Monasterio as Josephine "Josie" Montano
 Rochelle Barrameda as Maila Rivera
 Jao Mapa as Julio Vega
 Kit Thompson as Keith Villanueva
 Claudine Barretto as Clarisse Benitez
 Isabelle Daza as Annabelle
 Mariel Rey as Alexa
 Nathalie Hart as Vanessa
 Ynna Asistio as Yza
 Alden Richards as Dennis
 Steven Silva as Leo
 Bubbles Paraiso as Bunny
 Miguel Tanfelix as Miguel

Ratings
According to AGB Nielsen Philippines' Mega Manila People/Individual television ratings, the pilot episode of Reel Love Presents Tween Hearts earned a 4.6% rating. While the final episode scored a 13.3% rating in Mega Manila household television ratings.

Film adaptation
Tween Academy: Class of 2012 was directed by Mark Reyes and produced by GMA Films. Based on the show, it was released in theaters on August 24, 2011. The total of film's box office earnings is P32.23 million.

Tours
 Tween Hearts: The Mini Concert (October 24, 2012)

Accolades

References

External links
 

2010 Philippine television series debuts
2012 Philippine television series endings
Filipino-language television shows
GMA Network drama series
Philippine romance television series
Philippine teen drama television series
Television series about teenagers
Television shows set in Manila